Mymar is a genus of fairyflies in the family Mymaridae. There are about 10 described species in Mymar.

Species
These 10 species belong to the genus Mymar:
 Mymar africanum Annecke, 1961 c g
 Mymar cincinnati Girault, 1917 c g
 Mymar ermak Triapitsyn & Berezovskiy, 2001 c g
 Mymar maritimum Triapitsyn & Berezovskiy, 2001 c g
 Mymar pulchellum Curtis, 1832 c g
 Mymar ramym Donev & Triapitsyn g
 Mymar regale Enock, 1912 c g
 Mymar schwanni Girault, 1912 c g
 Mymar taprobanicum Ward, 1875 c g b
 Mymar wollastonii Westwood, 1879 g
Data sources: i = ITIS, c = Catalogue of Life, g = GBIF, b = Bugguide.net

References

Further reading

External links

 

Mymaridae